Stade Poitevin FC is a French football team based in the city of Poitiers, which was established in 1921. It was known as Poitiers FC between 2007 and 2018, and had a number of other names in its history. The club (as Stade Poitevin PEPP) spent the 1995–96 season in Ligue 2.

As of the 2019–20 season, the club play in Championnat National 3, the fifth level of French football, and are managed by Erwan Lannuzel.

History
The club was formed in 1921 as Sporting Club Poitevin, and joined the Division d'Honneur of the Ligue du Centre-Ouest in 1936. In 1952 the club lost its place in the league, and in order to regain it, merged with another local club Patronage des Écoles Publiques de Poitiers, becoming known as Stade Poitevin PEPP. The new club were champions of the DH Centre-Ouest in 1963, and gained promotion to the top level of amateur football, known as the Championnat de France Amateur.

The club was invited to the new "open" Division 2 in 1970. They were relegated to Division 3 in 1974 and Division 4 in 1988. Under the management of Denis Devaux the club achieved two successive promotions and played in the professional Division 2 for one season in 1995–96. Successive relegations followed, and the club played in Championnat de France Amateur 2 between 1999 and 2003. They were promoted again during the 2003–04 season, but suffered financial problems and were administratively relegate back to the Division d'Honneur.

The club relaunched under a new identity of Poitiers Foot 86 and in 2007 merged with rival club Cercle Education Physique Poitiers, taking the name Poitiers Football Club. With this identity the club won promotion to CFA2 in 2009. They were relegated again to Division d'Honneur at the end of the 2013–14 season.

In February 2016 the club announced a plan to return to their old Stade Poitevin FC name, and colours of black and white. The change was finally completed in the summer of 2018, after the club had gained promotion to Championnat National 3.

Players

Managers
 Lionel Charbonnier (2002–2004)
 Laurent Croci (2004–2005)

References

External links
 

 
Association football clubs established in 1921
Sport in Poitiers
1921 establishments in France
Football clubs in Nouvelle-Aquitaine